The following is a list of the TVB Star Awards Malaysia winners and nominees for My Favourite Most Improved TVB Actor and Actress. The award was first introduced in 2011 at the 2011 My AOD Favourites Awards as My Favourite Promising Actor and Actress. The ceremony was renamed TVB Star Awards Malaysia in 2013.

Winners and nominees

2010s

References

TVB Star Award for Most Improved Performances